Operation MH was the first major offensive by the combined forces of the Macedonian Army and police forces in the 2001 insurgency in Macedonia. The goal of the operation was to dislodge the NLA forces which were entrenched in Tetovo and the hills and villages in its vicinity.

Prelude 

Weeks prior Albanian rebels had taken control of the Tetovo fortress and several villages in the Tetovo municipality where sporadic fighting occurred between Macedonian security forces and Albanian rebels. The government conducted so called "search and sweep operations" that lead to several arrests

Execution of the Operation MH 

The operation started at 7am on 25 March with an hour long artillery barrage followed by Macedonian Army units moving in to encircle the villages held by the rebels. Helicopters covered the retreat and reinforcement routes that lead to Kosovo, during the first phase of the battle stiff resistance was encountered in  the village of Gajre and Šipkovica which was overcome with the assistance of police special forces and fresh reserves. The fall of Šipkovica and Gajre opened the path for the capture of the Tetovo fortress which was accomplished by the Macedonian Special Forces. According to Macedonian sources the rebels were fleeing in panic across the mountains leaving weapons and uniforms behind while Albanian sources called it a tactical retreat

See also

 Operation Vaksince
 Operation MH-2

References

2001 insurgency in Macedonia
2001 in the Republic of Macedonia